William Adolphus Hirschberg (1 December 1881 – 30 July 1963) was an Australian international rugby union player.

Hirschberg, a flanker, was born in Armidale, New South Wales and claimed one international rugby cap for Australia, playing against New Zealand, in Dunedin, on 2 September 1905. He had already played for New South Wales against New Zealand.

Hirschberg participated in the first inter-state game played in Western Australia, held in 1907, where he played as a forward for the winning team, New South Wales. He played another inter-state game against Queensland in 1910.

References

1881 births
1963 deaths
Australia international rugby union players
Australian rugby union players
Rugby union players from Armidale, New South Wales
Rugby union flankers